Ficheto Point (Nos Ficheto 'nos 'fi-che-to) is an ice-free point on the northeast coast of Varna Peninsula, Livingston Island, Antarctica forming the southeast side of the entrance to Dragon Cove. The area was visited by 19th century sealers.

The point is named after the famous Bulgarian architect, builder and sculptor Nikola Fichev – ‘Kolyu Ficheto’ (1800-1881).  Channel Rock was charted and descriptively named by the Discovery Investigations in 1935.

Location
(British mapping in 1935 and 1968, Bulgarian in 2005 and 2009).

See also 
 Composite Antarctic Gazetteer
 List of Antarctic islands south of 60° S
 SCAR
 Territorial claims in Antarctica

Maps
 L.L. Ivanov et al. Antarctica: Livingston Island and Greenwich Island, South Shetland Islands. Scale 1:100000 topographic map. Sofia: Antarctic Place-names Commission of Bulgaria, 2005.
 L.L. Ivanov. Antarctica: Livingston Island and Greenwich, Robert, Snow and Smith Islands. Scale 1:120000 topographic map.  Troyan: Manfred Wörner Foundation, 2009.

Notes

References
 Ficheto Point. SCAR Composite Gazetteer of Antarctica
 Bulgarian Antarctic Gazetteer. Antarctic Place-names Commission. (details in Bulgarian, basic data in English)

External links
 Ficheto Point. Copernix satellite image

Headlands of Livingston Island
Bulgaria and the Antarctic